Guilherme Moura de Oliveira (born 7 January 2005) is a Portuguese racing driver currently competing in the European Le Mans Series with Inter Europol Competition.

Early career

Lower formulae 
Near the end of 2020, Oliveira made his car racing debut, competing in the penultimate round of the F4 Spanish Championship with Drivex. He finished all three races in the top ten, with a best result of fourth in Race 2, but was unable to score points due to his status as a guest driver

Oliveira returned to Spanish F4 the following year, once again racing for Drivex alongside Maksim Arkhangelskiy, Branden Lee Oxley, Noam Abramczyk and Lola Lovinfosse. After a disappointing opening round in Spa-Francorchamps, the Portuguese driver took his first points in Navarra. Having withdrawn from his home round at Portimão due to COVID-19, Oliveira bounced back by scoring his maiden podium in Race 3 at Aragón, after defending successfully from eventual champion Dilano van 't Hoff. He ended his season with a pair of points finishes at Jerez and Barcelona respectively, which left him 13th in the drivers' standings.

Sportscar career

2021: Endurance debut 
In October 2021, Oliveira competed with Racing Experience in the season finale of the European Le Mans Series, driving in the LMP3 category.

2022: ELMS title challenge 
At the start of the following year, it was announced that he would be teaming up with Inter Europol Competition for the four-round long Asian Le Mans Series. Despite the team's struggles, exemplified by their failure to score a single podium during the campaign, Oliveira remained with Inter Europol for the European Le Mans Series, partnering Charles Crews and Nico Pino. Their season started out with a second place at Le Castellet, however the outfit would be disqualified from the results, after the Belleville washers in the differential of the car were found to not have complied with the championship's regulations during post-race scrutineering. The team struggled at Imola, having to settle for an eighth-placed finish after an early collision with a GTE car, but Oliveira and his teammates would score their first victory of the season in Monza, where the Portuguese driver took the lead during the final stint, crossing the line for his maiden win in car racing. The positive momentum continued as the squad won again at Barcelona, with Oliveira managing to build up enough of a gap on his rivals to make up for a ten-second time penalty. Oliveira, Pino and Crews capped off their winning streak at Spa, dominating the race and winning with a margin of 41 seconds, which put the team first in the championship going into the season finale in Portimão. However, a collision between Pino and the LMP2 car of Mathias Beche put Inter Europol on the back foot, with their title assault eventually ending mere laps before the finish when Oliveira hit the No. 95 TF Sport Aston Martin after exiting the pitlane, as the steering of Oliveira's car seized. The team finished second in the standings, seven points behind the No. 17 Cool Racing car.

2023 
Oliveira began his 2023 season by competing in the 24 Hours of Daytona with MRS GT-Racing in the LMP3 class, partnering Sebastián Álvarez, Danial Frost and Alex Vogel.

Karting record

Karting career summary

Racing record

Racing career summary 

† As Oliveira was a guest driver, he was ineligible to score points.* Season still in progress.

Complete F4 Spanish Championship results 
(key) (Races in bold indicate pole position) (Races in italics indicate fastest lap)

Complete European Le Mans Series results 
(key) (Races in bold indicate pole position; results in italics indicate fastest lap)

Complete WeatherTech SportsCar Championship results
(key) (Races in bold indicate pole position; results in italics indicate fastest lap)

References

External links 

 

2005 births
Living people
Portuguese racing drivers
Spanish F4 Championship drivers
European Le Mans Series drivers
Asian Le Mans Series drivers
Drivex drivers
WeatherTech SportsCar Championship drivers